The Yamaha XJ650 Maxim is a mid-size motorcycle by the Yamaha Motor Company introduced in 1980 as the Maxim I and produced through 1983. Yamaha designed the high-performance XJ650 as a brand-new four-cylinder with shaft drive, and built it specifically as a special cruiser. The XJ Maxim was the successor of the XS Special introduced in 1978.

History

Overview

The 4 cylinder, air-cooled, twin-cam 650cc engine is housed in a cross-braced duplex steel tube frame. Yamaha made the engine narrower by locating the alternator behind the cylinder block and above the gearbox rather than on the end of the crankshaft. The Maxim had shaft drive. Contemporary reports praised the Maxim's performance and braking. Criticism was aimed at engine vibration and under-damped suspension.  Succeeding Maxim models were refinements; the 1982 Maxim 650 had a more comfortable handlebar, an air-adjustable fork, and a more luxurious seat. A turbocharged variant, the XJ650 Seca Turbo, was featured in the 1983 James Bond film Never Say Never Again.

Cycle magazine said in 1982 "Three years later, after the wide proliferation of special styling, it's easy to forget what a landmark bike the Maxim was...The 650 was striking, controversial, sensational, and wildly successful in showrooms. Other companies have produced bodacious knock-offs of the 650 Maxim, imitations that suffer from excess. It's too bad the Maxim was obscured when manufacturers blanketed the market with cruisers. A decade down the road, the Maxim may well be a genuine classic of the 1980s — a bright idea that stood the test of time."

Engine/Drivetrain

The 1980 to 1983 XJ650 Maxim combined an air-cooled, 653 cc DOHC two valves per cylinder transverse inline-four engine and shaft drive. The engine employed a one-piece crankshaft with plain bearings and placed the alternator and starter behind the engine to minimize width. A chain drives the two overhead camshafts, which used shim-and-bucket adjustment. A second chain drives the oil pump located in the crankcase, while a third (Hy-Vo) chain spins the alternator. The power unit is fed by four Hitachi constant velocity carburetors and lit by electronic ignition. Four-into-two headers extracts the waste gases, which exit through two shortened mufflers. 
Hypoid gears and a shaft turns the rear wheel, with the shaft housing forming the left side swingarm.

See also
List of Yamaha motorcycles

References

External links

XJ650 Maxim
Cruiser motorcycles
Motorcycles introduced in 1980
Shaft drive motorcycles